K20JX-D (channel 27) is a low-power, Class A television station licensed to Sacramento, California, United States, affiliated with 3ABN. Founded on August 21, 1990, the station was owned by Abundant Life Broadcasting, Inc., which had sold it to Amazing Facts, LLC. Amazing Facts sold it to HC2 Holdings in 2018.

History 
The station's construction permit was initially issued on August 21, 1990 under the calls of K56EN. From 1993 until 2010, it used K27EU as its callsign. The current K20JX-D was assigned on November 8, 2010.

Technical information

Subchannels
The station's signal is multiplexed:

References

External links 

Religious television stations in the United States
Innovate Corp.
20JX-D
Television channels and stations established in 1990
1990 establishments in California
Low-power television stations in the United States